Isoperla bilineata, the two-lined stripetail, is a species of green-winged stonefly in the family Perlodidae. It is found in North America.

References

Further reading

 
 
 

Perlodidae